The lateral costotransverse ligament is a fibrous band that crosses transversely from the posterior surface of the tip of a transverse process of a vertebra to the non-articular part of the tubercle of the corresponding rib. It stabilizes the costotransverse joint.

References

Thorax (human anatomy)
Back anatomy
Ligaments